The Municipality of Lot 11 and Area is a municipality that holds community status in Prince Edward Island, Canada. It is located within Prince County.

Despite its name being derived from the township of Lot 11, the municipality's boundaries do not include all of this township and extend into the neighbouring township of Lot 12. The municipality's seat is in the community of Freeland.

Communities 
This municipality contains the following communities:

Lot 11
 Conway
 Foxley River
 Freeland
 Murray Road
 Poplar Grove

Lot 12
 East Bideford
 Poplar Grove

Demographics 

References 

Communities in Prince County, Prince Edward Island
Rural municipalities in Prince Edward Island